Cophixalus zweifeli is a species of frog in the family Microhylidae. It is endemic to northern Queensland, Australia, and only known from the area of its type locality in the Cape Melville National Park. The species was named to honour American herpetologist Richard G. Zweifel. Common name Zweifel's frog has been coined for it. It is one of the five northeast Australian Cophixalus species that are specialized in boulder field habitats.

Description
Adult males measure  and adult females  in snout–vent length. The snout is elongated, truncated in dorsal view and straight, slightly projecting laterally. The tympanum is large but obscured dorsally. Fingers II–IV have greatly enlarged, truncated discs. The toe discs are also enlarged but smaller than those of the fingers. The dorsum is tan with some darker brown spots. A dark canthal stripe runs from the tip of the snout to slightly beyond the tympanum.

The male advertisement call is a single high-pitched "yelp" composed of hundreds of fine pulses.

Habitat and conservation
Cophixalus zweifeli live in boulder fields amongst and adjacent to rainforest. They are nocturnal. Males call from boulders on the ground. Cophixalus zweifeli is sympatric with Cophixalus petrophilus, but the latter is restricted to boulder fields largely devoid of vegetation, whereas the former is associated with boulders under or near rainforest.

In the past, logging was a threat to this species. At present, a more likely threat is habitat degradation caused by increased visitation to the Cape Melville National Park.

References

zweifeli
Amphibians of Queensland
Endemic fauna of Australia
Amphibians described in 1998
Taxonomy articles created by Polbot
Frogs of Australia